was a district located in Shiga Prefecture, Japan.

As of 2003, the district had an estimated population of 27,986 and a density of 79.65 persons per km2. The total area was 351.38 km2.

Former towns and villages 
Kinomoto
Nishiazai
Takatsuki
Yogo

Merger 
On January 1, 2010, the towns of Kinomoto, Nishiazai, Takatsuki and Yogo, along with the towns of Kohoku and Torahime (both from Higashiazai District) were merged into the expanded Nagahama. Higashiazai District and Ika District were both dissolved as a result of this merger.

References 

Former districts of Shiga Prefecture